Tim Papps (born 22 April 1981) is a New Zealand cricketer. He played in seven first-class matches for Canterbury in 2004 and 2005.

See also
 List of Canterbury representative cricketers

References

External links
 

1981 births
Living people
New Zealand cricketers
Canterbury cricketers
Cricketers from Christchurch